Live in Ancient Kourion is a live album by American heavy metal band Iced Earth. The album was recorded August 19, 2012 at the 2300 year-old Kourion Theater in Kourion, Cyprus during the band's Dystopia World Tour.

Track listing

Personnel
Iced Earth
Stu Block – lead vocals
Jon Schaffer – guitars, vocals
Troy Seele – guitars
Luke Appleton – bass guitar, vocals
Brent Smedley – drums

Production
Jim Morris – engineer, mastering, mixing
Nikolas Prokopiou – recording engineer
Christodoulos Procopiou – recording engineer
Felipe Machado Franco – artwork
Nathan Perry – artwork

References

Iced Earth albums
2013 live albums